The Central Organization of Trade Unions (COTU) is a national trade union center in Kenya. It was founded in 1965 upon the dissolution on the Kenya Federation of Labour and the African Workers' Congress. It currently closely liaises with Non Governmental Organizations of East Africa Trade Union (NGOEATU).

Affiliated unions
Amalgamated Union of Kenya Metal Workers
Kenya Petroleum Oil Workers Union
Bakery, Confectionery Manufacturing and Allied Workers Union (K) (BACOFOMAWU,K)
Kenya Building, Construction, Timber, Furniture & Allied Trades Employees Union
Kenya Chemical & Allied Workers Union
Kenya Engineering Workers Union
Kenya Game Hunting and Safari Workers Union
Kenya Union of Printing, Publishing, Paper Manufacturing & Allied Workers
Kenya Plantation and Agricultural Workers Union
Kenya Scientific, Research, International, Technical & Allied Institutions
Banking Insurance & Finance Union (K)
Communications Workers Union (K)
Railway Workers Union (K)
Tailors & Textiles Workers Union
Transport & Allied Workers Union
Kenya Union of Entertainment & Music Industry Employees
Kenya Union of Domestic, Hotels, Educational Institutions, Hospitals & Allied Workers
Kenya Union of Sugar Plantation Workers
Kenya County Government Workers Union
Seaferers Workers Union
Kenya Quarry & Mine Workers Union
Kenya Electrical Trades Allied Workers Union
Kenya Shoe & Leather Workers Union
Kenya Jockey, Betting Workers Union
Union of National, Research Institutes Staff of Kenya (UNRISK)
Kenya National Private Security Workers Union
Kenya Hotels & Allied Workers Union
Kenya Union of Commercial, Food & Allied Workers
Kenya Aviation and Allied Workers Union
Kenya Union of Journalists
Kenya Long Distance Truck Drivers and Allied Workers Union
Kenya Union of Post Primary Education Teachers (KUPPET)
Kenya Union of Special Needs
Kenya Union of Hair and Beauty Salon Workers (KUHABSWO)
Kenya National Union of Nurses
Kenya Glass Workers Union
Kenya Aviation Workers Union
Kenya Airline Pilots Association
National Union of Water & Sewerage
Kenya Union of Pre-Primary Education Teachers (KUNOPPET)

==References==

External links
 

Trade unions in Kenya
International Trade Union Confederation
Kenya
Trade unions established in 1965